Lucian Gruin (born 31 October 1913, date of death unknown) was a Romanian footballer who played as a striker.

International career
Lucian Gruin played one match in which he scored a goal for Romania when coach Constantin Rădulescu used him in a 2–2 against Greece at the 1935 Balkan Cup.

Honours
Venus București
Divizia A: 1936–37

References

External links
 

1913 births
Year of death missing
Romanian footballers
Romania international footballers
Place of birth missing
Association football forwards
Liga I players
Chinezul Timișoara players
Venus București players